Chapayevo (Keşen-Evla) is a rural locality (a selo) in Novolaksky District, Republic of Dagestan, Russia. The population was 2,386 as of 2010. There are 55 streets.

Geography 
It is located south of Khasavyurt, on the left bank of the Yaryk-su River.

Nationalities 
Chechens and Laks live there.

References 

Rural localities in Novolaksky District